The Great Midwest Marijuana Harvest Festival is the longest running cannabis rights festival in the United States, held annually in Madison, Wisconsin since 1971.

The festival was initiated and organized by Yippie and cannabis activist Ben Masel until his death in 2011.

In 2014, the 44th annual festival was held at Library Mall. The same space was used in 2016.

What would have been the golden anniversary festival in 2020 had to be deferred to 2021.

References

External links

What Does 420 Friendly Means?

1971 establishments in Wisconsin
1971 in cannabis
Annual events in Wisconsin
Cannabis culture
Cannabis events in the United States
Cannabis in Wisconsin
Culture of Madison, Wisconsin
Festivals established in 1971
Festivals in Wisconsin